The Transpac 52  (TP52) is a class of yacht used for competitive 52 Super Series yacht racing, and the Audi MedCup previously, besides the world championship of the class. The class is recognised by the International Sailing Federation which entitles the class to hold an Official World Championships.

History
The TP52 Class has grown from a non registered club of like minded yachtsmen inspired by Tom Pollack to a fully member controlled, registered and ISAF recognised Class with a proper set of Bylaws, an Annual Meeting, an Executive Committee made up out of the Members and a Class President who also has to be a Member.

The original intention was to provide a yacht capable for both inshore and offshore sailing specifically the Transpacific Yacht Race however with the decline in IMS racing, the class became popular in Europe. A professional inshore tour was established for Europe called the MedCup. Recent (2022-23) rule changes help keep the class at the forefront of competitive racing.

The Box Rule
TP52 boats are built and sailed to a set of rules which established the original design as a 'box' rule - where the boat must fit within a notional box of specified dimensions.

Events

World Championship

Global Championship

The unofficial World Championship was held before it got international status and were the keystone of the formation of the class.

European Series

The competition changed the nature of the class with it becoming a pinnacle inshore/coastal event for grand prix monohulled yacht racing. The series started off as the MedCup from 2005 to 2011 before evolving in the 52 Super Series.

Offshore Events
TP 52s or optimized direct derivatives have won the overall trophy in most of the classic offshore events while racing under the major international handicap systems. Notable results include:

Coastal Races

References

External links
  Official TP52 Class Association Website
 World Sailing TP52 Microsite Website

 
Classes of World Sailing
World championships in sailing
Sailing yachts
Box rule sailing classes